Yannick Eijssen (born 26 June 1989) is a retired Belgian cyclist, born in Leuven, Belgium. Eijssen last rode for UCI Continental team . Being considered a great talent in the youth categories, Eijssen started his professional career at UCI ProTeam . However, on the pro level, Eijssen never lived up to the expectations, and in May 2016, age 26, he announced his retirement at the end of the season.

Career achievements

Major results

2008
4th Grote Prijs Stad Waregem
6th Overall Ronde de l'Isard
2009
3rd Overall Tour des Pays de Savoie
2010
1st  Overall Ronde de l'Isard
1st Stage 3
1st Beverbeek Classic
1st Stage 4 Tour de l'Avenir
2nd Road race, National Under−23 Road Championships
3rd Overall Tour des Pyrénées
6th U23 Liège–Bastogne–Liège
2012
1st Stage 1 (TTT) Giro del Trentino
2014
1st Stage 1 (TTT) Giro del Trentino

Grand Tour general classification results timeline

References

External links

1989 births
Living people
Belgian male cyclists
Sportspeople from Leuven
Cyclists from Flemish Brabant